K19FD-D is a low-power television station serving Camp Verde, Arizona. It broadcasts in digital on UHF channel 19 from its transmitter located on Squaw Peak south of town, and is an affiliate of The Hope Channel, the flagship station of the Adventist Television Network (ATN), operated by the Seventh-day Adventist Church. The station is locally owned by Central States Communications.

History
An original construction permit was granted to Central States Communications on July 3, 2002 to build a low-power television station K19FD on channel 19 to serve Camp Verde. The station was licensed on June 13, 2005, but did not begin airing programming until early 2006. The station was licensed for digital operation effective January 14, 2022, changing its name to K19FD-D.

See also
 Media ministries of the Seventh-day Adventist Church

External links
Hope Channel official site

Religious television stations in the United States
Seventh-day Adventist media
19FD-D
Television channels and stations established in 2005
2005 establishments in Arizona
Low-power television stations in the United States